Theretra is a genus of moths in the family Sphingidae. The genus was established by Jacob Hübner in 1819.

Species

Ecology

Pollination
Several species of the genus Theretra, namely Theretra japonica and Theretra nessus, have been reported to pollinate the orchid species Vanda falcata.

References

 
Macroglossini
Moth genera
Taxa named by Jacob Hübner